Alkalihalobacillus alcalophilus (formerly Bacillus alcalophilus) is a Gram-positive, rod-shaped species of bacteria.  Likely strains of this species have been isolated from highly alkaline waste water. A. alcalophilus is a moderate halotolerant obligate alkaliphile growing at 40 °C and at pH 9–10.5 (and possibly higher) that has been isolated from soil and animal manures.

This species was transferred into the genus Alkalihalobacillus in 2020 after a phylogenomic study to resolve the polyphyly of the genus Bacillus.

Genome
A draft genome of A. alcalophilus strain AV1934 has 4,348,660 bp, with 3,745 predicted proteins. The G+C content of the genome is 37.2%.  Another draft genome has 4,095 predicted genes and 4,063 predicted proteins.

References

Further reading

External links
Type strain of Bacillus alcalophilus at BacDive -  the Bacterial Diversity Metadatabase

Bacillaceae
Bacteria described in 1934